Krip Kapur Suri, (born 14 June 1986) is an Indian model turned actor. He is primarily known for his role of Prof. Vardhan Suryavanshi in Channel V India’s Sadda Haq and Raahukaal in Life OK’s Savitri. He also portrayed the role of Ravi Garewal in Life OK's Kalash and Adhiraj Rajawat in Zee TV's Jeet Gayi Toh Piya Morey and of Duryodhan in RadhaKrishn on Star Bharat.

Personal life
Krip was born into a Punjabi middle-class family hailing from Delhi. Krip had always dreamt of becoming a successful actor, though didn't even have money to enroll himself into an acting school. In an interview he stated: “I arrived in Mumbai ten years ago on 17 January 2003 and was living in a room with eight people. I was unable to pay rent and was out on the streets for three days. On seeing me sleeping on the streets a generous soul offered me accommodation till I could afford to find a roof over my head and pay rent for the same. I was also without any morsel of food for six days.” However he soon passed this struggling phase with his strong dedication towards acting. Krip has a great interest in photography and is a good football player too.“Well, acting is my career. But yes, along with acting, I would like to work really hard on my photography skills. I want to keep a really good collection of photographs clicked by me. My camera is my best friend.” says he.

Filmography

Films

Television

References

External links

 Facebook Profile
 Twitter Profile
 

Living people
Male actors in Hindi television
Indian male models
Male actors from Delhi
Punjabi people
1986 births
Actors from Mumbai